Abu Flous Port is an Iraqi port. It lies in Abu Al-Khaseeb, Basrah and is situated on the Persian Gulf.

Ports and harbours of Iraq
Ports and harbours of the Arab League
Transport in the Arab League